Jack Poole Plaza is a plaza in Vancouver's Coal Harbour neighborhood, in the British Columbia, Canada. The space is named after Jack Poole. The site is home to the cauldron that burned during the 2010 Olympic and Paralympic Winter Games.

References

External links
 

Coal Harbour
Squares in Canada